Drapetisca australis is a spider in the family Linyphiidae. It is found in the Antipodes Islands.

The species was first described in 1955, by Raymond R. Forster, based on a female specimen only. The total body length of the female is about 28 mm, with the first leg being the longest at about 54 mm. The carapace is pale yellow with a dark line in the centre and at the edges; the abdomen is paler with a short thin black line near the cephalothorax and two black patches in the middle of the underside.

References

Linyphiidae
Spiders of Oceania
Spiders described in 1955